Dean Mark Wilkins (born 12 July 1962) is an English football coach and former professional player. He was most recently the assistant manager of League Two club Stevenage.

Managerial career
Wilkins assumed the position of caretaker manager at Brighton & Hove Albion when Mark McGhee was sacked in early September 2006. Later that month, it was announced that Wilkins had been given the job on a permanent basis. On 3 April, Wilkins was offered a three-year contract with Brighton & Hove Albion, which was agreed on 24 April.

On 31 July 2009, Wilkins was named as Alan Pardew's assistant manager at Southampton. On 30 August 2010, Wilkins was appointed caretaker manager at Southampton after manager Alan Pardew was sacked, until 12 September when Nigel Adkins was appointed. He was dismissed, along with Adkins, on 18 January 2013.

Following his departure from Southampton, Wilkins was a member of the coaching staff for Reading, Sheffield United and Crystal Palace. 

Wilkins was appointed as assistant manager at Stevenage on 18 December 2020, who were in 23rd position in League Two at the time of his appointment. The move meant that Wilkins would be assisting manager Alex Revell, who he had managed during his time as manager at Brighton. He stated the position particularly appealed to him as he was looking to help a first-time manager. Under his leadership Wilkins was able to help Stevenage climb the league table and finish in 14th place. After winning their first two league matches to start the 2021-2022 season Stevenage would only win one game in their next 14, culminating in the departure of manager Alex Revell and assistant manager Dean Wilkins on 14 November 2021.

Managerial statistics

*Caretaker manager

References

External links

Dean Wilkins profile at ELFvoetbal.nl 

1962 births
Living people
English footballers
Footballers from Hillingdon
Association football midfielders
English Football League players
Eredivisie players
Queens Park Rangers F.C. players
Myllykosken Pallo −47 players
Brighton & Hove Albion F.C. players
Leyton Orient F.C. players
PEC Zwolle players
English football managers
Brighton & Hove Albion F.C. managers
Sheffield United F.C. non-playing staff 
Southampton F.C. managers
Southampton F.C. non-playing staff
Stevenage F.C. non-playing staff 
Reading F.C. non-playing staff
Crystal Palace F.C. non-playing staff 
Dean
English expatriate footballers
English expatriate sportspeople in Finland
Expatriate footballers in Finland
English expatriate sportspeople in the Netherlands
Expatriate footballers in the Netherlands